The sunflower miner bee (Andrena helianthi) is a species of miner bee in the family Andrenidae. Another common name for this species is the sunflower andrena. It is found in North America.

References

Further reading

External links

 

helianthi
Articles created by Qbugbot
Insects described in 1891